Adam Gazzaley (born December 29, 1968) is an American neuroscientist, author, photographer, entrepreneur and inventor. He is the founder and executive director of Neuroscape and the David Dolby Distinguished Professor of Neurology, Physiology, and Psychiatry at University of California, San Francisco (UCSF). He is co-founder and chief science advisor of Akili Interactive Labs and JAZZ Venture Partners. Gazzaley is the inventor of the first video game approved by the FDA as a medical treatment. He is a board of trustee member, science council member and fellow of the California Academy of Sciences. He has authored over 170 scientific articles.

Career

Early life
Gazzaley  graduated from the Bronx High School of Science in 1986. He received a Bachelor of Science degree in biochemistry from Binghamton University in 1990, followed by MD and PhD degrees in neuroscience through the NIH-sponsored Medical Scientist Training Program at the Mount Sinai School of Medicine in New York. His doctoral research on plasticity of glutamate receptors in the hippocampus and implications for cognitive changes in normal aging earned him the 1997 Krieg Cortical Scholar Award. He completed an internship in internal medicine (1998–1999) and residency in neurology (1999–2002) at the University of Pennsylvania Health System.

Following residency in 2002, Gazzaley had a research fellowship at the University of California, Berkeley, and simultaneously worked as attending neurologist at the Northern California VA Medical Center, UCSF Medical Center and completed a clinical fellowship in cognitive neurology at the University of California, San Francisco Memory and Aging Center where he became board-certified in neurology.

Research
Gazzaley founded Gazzaley Lab at UCSF in 2006 and the UCSF Neuroscience Imaging Center in 2007. His research approach uses a combination of human neurophysiological tools, including functional magnetic resonance imaging (fMRI), electroencephalography (EEG) and transcranial stimulation (TES). He used this approach to show that older adults exhibit neural deficits in suppressing distractions and also while multitasking.

Several of Gazzaley's studies explore how cognitive abilities may be enhanced via engagement with custom designed video games, neurofeedback and TES. In 2009 he designed a video game, NeuroRacer, to enhance cognitive abilities of older adults. In a study published in 2013 as the cover story of Nature he showed that the multitasking nature of the game caused improvements in tasks outside of the game involving working memory and sustained attention.

He created the Neuroscape Lab at UCSF , an environment designed to create and validate neurodiagnostics and neurotherapeutics using newly emerging technology. He developed the GlassBrain, a 3D MRI brain visualization that displays overlaid rhythmic brain activity in real-time using EEG recordings in collaboration with scientists at UCSD.

In 2016, he merged Gazzaley Lab, Neuroscience Imaging Center and Neuroscape Lab into one research center – Neuroscape — with the mission of bridging technology and neuroscience to create real-world solutions to enhance brain function.

Industry
In 2001, Gazzaley founded his first company, Wanderings Inc, to sell fine art prints of his nature photography.

In 2011, Gazzaley co-founded Akili Interactive Labs, a company that develops, validates and distributes digital medicine via scientifically validated video games, and serves as a board member and its chief science advisor. On June 15, 2020, Akili's EndeavorRx was FDA-cleared as a prescription treatment for children with ADHD.  This landmark event marked the first FDA-cleared digital treatment for ADHD, and the first video game approved by the FDA as the treatment of any medical condition. It was reviewed through FDA's de novo pathway and so its clearance creates a new regulatory classification of medicine.

In 2015, he co-founded JAZZ Venture Partners, a venture capital firm investing in experiential technology to improve human performance, and serves as its chief scientist.

In 2016, Gazzaley co-founded Sensync, a company creating a sensory immersion vessel to offer a novel wellness treatment called the Deep Brain Massage. He served as its chief science advisor until 2021 when the company was dissolved.

Public and media appearances
Gazzaley has delivered over 700 talks around the world on his research and perspectives. His public speaking has been recognized by receiving the 2015 Science Educator Award by the Society for Neuroscience.

He has been profiled in The New York Times, The New Yorker, The Wall Street Journal, Time, Discover, Wired, PBS, NPR, CNN, NBC Nightly News, The Today Show, and Good Morning America. In 2013, he wrote and hosted the nationally televised, PBS-sponsored special, "The Distracted Mind with Dr. Adam Gazzaley". In 2014, he co-hosted TEDMED. He has appeared in several TV documentaries.

Gazzaley has a chapter giving advice in Tim Ferriss' book Tools of Titans.

Awards and honors
  1997 Krieg Cortical Kudos- Cortical Scholar Award
  2005 Cermak Award
  2015 Elected Membership in American Society for Clinical Investigation
  2015 Society for Neuroscience –  Science Educator Award
  2017 Prose Award
  2020	Fellow of the California Academy of Sciences
  2020 Global Gaming Citizen Honor
  2021	Newsweek's inaugural list of America's Greatest Disruptors
  2022	Fast Company’s list of the World’s Most Innovative Companies
  2022	AURORA Institute Prize

Works

Book
Gazzaley authored The Distracted Mind: Ancient Brains in a High-Tech World, along with Dr. Larry Rosen. It was published by MIT Press in October 2016. 
It won the 2017 Prose Award in the category of Biomedicine and Neuroscience

Select research articles

References

External links
Neuroscape

American neurologists
University of California, San Francisco faculty
American neuroscientists
1968 births
Living people
People from Brooklyn
Binghamton University alumni
University of California, San Francisco alumni
Scientists from New York (state)